David Andrew Robertson (born May 1962) is a Scottish Presbyterian minister and religious commentator. Robertson was the minister of St Peter's Free Church in Dundee, Scotland, from 1992 until 2019. He served as Moderator of the Free Church of Scotland between 2015 and 2016. Robertson is also a blogger, podcaster, and writer. He gained public attention following his critique of The God Delusion by Richard Dawkins and has since become a commentator on religious, social, and political affairs in Scotland, with an annual readership of over one million.

Education 
Robertson graduated from both the University of Edinburgh with a degree in History, and from Free Church College (now Edinburgh Theological Seminary) with a degree in Theology, in 1983.

Career
Robertson had originally planned a career in politics, intending to stand for the Social Democratic Party (SDP) in his home seat of Ross, Cromarty and Skye in the 1983 General Election. However, a failed bid to become Senior President of Edinburgh University Students Association precipitated a change in direction, and in 1986 he became the youngest minister in the Free Church of Scotland (aged 24), while his contemporary Charles Kennedy went on to win the same seat he had hoped to contest; becoming the youngest Member of Parliament (aged 23) in the process.

Robertson’s first full-time ministry charge was in Brora Free Church from 1983. He became the minister of St Peter’s Free Church, Dundee, (the historic church of Robert Murray McCheyne), in October 1992, where he worked closely with Scottish theologian Sinclair Ferguson. He was the Moderator of the Free Church of Scotland between 2015-2016, replacing Rev David Miller.

Robertson co-founded Solas (Centre for Public Christianity) in June 2010 with the former SNP leader, Gordon Wilson, who was a member of St Peter's Free Church in his final years. Robertson remained the director of Solas until 2018.

Robertson's ministry became increasingly engaged with secular audiences until he entered apologetics ministry full-time in 2019.
 
Before moving to Australia in 2019, he was also a chaplain at the University of Dundee and former club chaplain of Dundee F.C.

Writings and broadcasting 
Robertson's writings have been featured in The Scotsman and Christian Today, and he has appeared several times on Moody Radio. He sits on the editorial advisory board for Scottish Christian Broadcast.

Robertson hosts a weekly podcast on current affairs called Quantum of Solas, which began during his role with Solas Centre for Public Christianity. He featured in another podcast series, Unbelievable?, debating several prominent atheists. He was also the editor of The Record, the Free Church’s main magazine for several years.

Robertson has a blog, The Wee Flea, the name of which alludes both to Richard Dawkins' description of Robertson, John Lennox, and Alister McGrath as "fleas living off a dog's back", and to the Scottish colloquialism "Wee Frees" - referring to the Free Church of Scotland. In 2017, Robertson's blog was viewed 900,000 times from 190 countries and by April 2021 it had a total of over 6 million hits.

Awards
In 2014, 2015, and 2016, Robertson was voted one of the 100 most influential Christians in the UK by online voters on "Archbishop Cranmer's Top 100 List".

Robertson's blog won Runner Up in "Blogger of the Year" category in 2014, and featured as a Finalist in the "Most Inspiring Leadership Blog" category in 2015, both of the Premier Digital Christian New Media Awards.

Selected publications 
A.S.K. : Real World Questions / Real World Answers (2019) , for teenagers.
Quench : Cafe Culture Evangelism (2014)  
Engaging with Atheists : Understanding their world; sharing good news (2014) 
Magnificent Obsession : Why Jesus Is Great (2013) .
Awakening : the life and ministry of Robert Murray McCheyne (2010) ,  a contemporary account of Robert Murray McCheyne's life
The Dawkins letters : challenging atheist myths (2007) ,  a response to Richard Dawkins' The God Delusion

Debates 
Through his roles in Solas Centre for Public Christianity, and the 'Unbelievable?' podcast, Robertson has debated several public figures on a range of social and theological issues: 
 BBC Scotland - Debate Night; The panel included: depute leader of the SNP at Westminster, Kirsty Blackman; the Conservative MP for Stirling, Stephen Kerr; the Scottish Labour MSP for Mid Scotland and Fife, Alex Rowley; President of the Royal Society of Edinburgh, Dame Anne Glover. Topics debated: Brexit, Trump, and the NHS. 2 June 2019
 Peter Tatchell (Peter Tatchell Foundation) The Future of Marriage Debate; 11 December 2013
 Scott S McKenna (Church of Scotland) on atonement; A public conversation; chaired by Rt Rev Dr Angus Morrison (Moderator of the Church of Scotland)
 Matt Dillahunty (American public speaker, internet personality, atheist); Why I Am Not An Atheist; and 'Why I Am Not A Christian'
 Patrick Harvie MSP (Scottish Green Party) & William Rennie MSP (Scottish Liberal Democrats) versus David Robertson & Peter D Williams; Same Sex Marriage?
 Michael Shermer (Skeptics Society); Is Christianity Good For Us
 Gary McLelland (Scottish Liberal Democrats, Humanist Society Scotland); Is Belief in God a Delusion?; Is Belief in God Reasonable
 Michael Nugent (Atheist Ireland); Is Christianity Holding Us Back?
 Peter Cave (British Humanist Association); Better With or Without God
 Alistair Mcbay (National Secular Society); Is Faith in God a Delusion?
 Andrew Copson FRSA, MCMI, MCIPR (Chief Executive, British Humanist Association; President, International Humanist and Ethical Union); Are We Better Off Without God
 Adrian Hyyrylainen-Trett (Liberal Democrats); The Gay Marriage Debate
 Peter D Williams (Executive Officer, Right To Life); Catholic vs Protestant - Is the Catholic Church the One True Church?
 Robertson regularly debated at Abertay University held by its Division of Sociology.

References

External links
David Robertson's Blog

1962 births
Living people
20th-century Ministers of the Free Church of Scotland
20th-century Presbyterians
21st-century Ministers of the Free Church of Scotland
21st-century Presbyterians
21st-century Scottish male writers
Presbyterian writers
Scottish evangelicals
Scottish religious writers